Raam is a 2006 Indian Telugu-language action comedy film written and directed by N.Shankar starring Nithiin, Genelia D'Souza and Hrishitaa Bhatt in lead roles and Krishnam Raju in a very vital role. The film, produced by Nitin's father Sudhakar Reddy, has music scored by Yuvan Shankar Raja and was released on 30 March 2006 to good responses. The film was later dubbed and released in Hindi as Jeene Do: Let Us Live in 2008 by Sumeet Arts.

Synopsis
Raam, is a happy-go-lucky guy in Hyderabad. He is an upcoming cycle champion. A win in a competition takes him to the final round in Mumbai. However, life in Mumbai life pans out unexpectedly for him. He ends up unraveling the gritty knots of his family, especially that of his grandfather Dasharatha Ramaiah.

Cast

 Nithiin as Raam
 Genelia D'Souza as Janaki / Lakshmi
 Hrishitaa Bhatt as Jyotika
 Krishnam Raju as Dasharatha Ramaiah
 Atul Kulkarni as Veerendra, Janaki's father
 Devaraj as Rahim
 Prasad Babu as Raam's father
 Rajya Lakshmi as Raam's mother
 Sana as Janaki's mother
 Brahmanandam as Dr. Chakravarti
 Ali
 Kovai Sarala
 MS Narayana
 Telangana Shakuntala
 Venu Madhav as Janaki's brother
 Jeeva
 AVS
 Dharmavarapu Subramanyam
 Supreeth

Soundtrack
The soundtrack was composed by noted Tamil composer Yuvan Shankar Raja. It was released at Taj Banjara, Hyderabad on 10 March 2006 and features 5 tracks overall. The lyrics were penned by Chinni Charan, Chandrabose and Bhuvanachandra.

References

External links

2006 films
2000s Telugu-language films
2006 action drama films
Indian action drama films
Films about religious violence in India
Ayodhya dispute
Films scored by Yuvan Shankar Raja
Films set in Mumbai
Films shot in Mumbai
Films set in Maharashtra
Films shot in Maharashtra
Films directed by N. Shankar